The Church of Our Lady of Mercy and St. Jude Taddhaeus, popularly known as La Merced, is a Roman Catholic parish church in Villa Muñoz, Montevideo, Uruguay.

The temple dates back to 1907; the crypt was consecrated on 8 September 1927. Originally held by the Mercedarians, now it belongs to the Metropolitan Curia. It is dedicated to Our Lady of Mercy and to the apostle Saint Jude Taddhaeus. The church was declared a sanctuary.

The parish was established on 30 January 1936.

References

1936 establishments in Uruguay
Roman Catholic churches completed in 1927
Roman Catholic church buildings in Montevideo
20th-century Roman Catholic church buildings in Uruguay